Kung Fu Panda: Legends of Awesomeness is an American television series based on DreamWorks Animation's Kung Fu Panda franchise. Two special previews aired on Nickelodeon on September 19, 2011 and October 21, 2011, with the official premiere of the series on November 7, 2011. The first official episode of the series averaged 3.1 million in its premiere, slightly behind SpongeBob SquarePants, one of the Nickelodeon's highest rating television series. On March 10, 2011, Nickelodeon announced that the series "has been picked up for 26 additional episodes (for a total of 52) and will debut later this year." A total of 52 episodes were initially ordered  for the series. The third season had been confirmed by Oktobor Animation, a New Zealand based CG animation studio, which has signed to provide animation and post services on the second and third seasons of Kung Fu Panda: Legends of Awesomeness. After they aired as the first two seasons, another 28 episodes were added as the third season. The third season finished airing first in Germany, with episode 80 debuting January 7, 2015 on Nicktoons. The rest of season 3 eventually continued airing in the United States just over a year later. The third season completed airing in the United States on June 29, 2016.

Kung Fu Panda: Legends of Awesomeness features the voice talents of Mick Wingert, Fred Tatasciore, Kari Wahlgren, James Sie, and Max Koch, with Lucy Liu and James Hong reprising their roles from the  Kung Fu Panda movies.

Series overview

Episodes

Season 1 (2011–12)

The first season of Kung Fu Panda: Legends of Awesomeness consists of 26 episodes.

Season 2 (2012–13)

The second season of Kung Fu Panda: Legends of Awesomeness consists of 26 episodes.

Season 3 (2013–16)

The third season of Kung Fu Panda: Legends of Awesomeness consists of 28 episodes.

Notes

References

Kung Fu Panda: Legends of Awesomeness
Kung Fu Panda: Legends of Awesomeness